Coralberry is a common name for several plants and may refer to:
 Aechmea fulgens, an herb in the family Bromeliaceae native to Brazil
 Ardisia crenata, a shrub in the family Primulaceae native to Asia
 Ilex verticillata, a shrub in the family Aquifoliaceae native to eastern North America
 Symphoricarpos orbiculatus, a shrub in the family Caprifoliaceae native to eastern and central North America